Anne Elisabeth Stengl is the Christy Award-winning author of the fantasy series Tales of Goldstone Wood, published by Bethany House Publishers.  USA Today called the series "epically driven high fantasy".  Her books Heartless and Veiled Rose both won Christy Awards, and Starflower was nominated in 2013.  Stengl is known for her use of third-person omniscient narrative and non-chronological series progression.  She studied illustration at Grace College and English literature at Campbell University.

Bibliography

Tales of Goldstone Wood 

 2010 Heartless Her most widely held book, according to WorldCat; it is held in 605 libraries  
 2011 Veiled Rose
 2012 Moonblood
 2012 Starflower
 2013 Dragonwitch
 2013 Goddess Tithe (Novella).
 2014 Shadow Hand
 2014 Golden Daughter
 2015 Draven's Light

Other works 

 2016 A Branch of Silver, a Branch of Gold

References

External links 
 Anne Elisabeth Stengl's Blog

1986 births
Living people
American fantasy writers
American women novelists
Campbell University alumni
Women science fiction and fantasy writers
21st-century American novelists
21st-century American women writers
People from Pierce County, Washington
Novelists from Washington (state)
Grace College alumni